Two Smart People is a 1946 American drama film directed by Jules Dassin and starring Lucille Ball and John Hodiak, Lloyd Nolan and Hugo Haas.

Plot
Ace Connors (John Hodiak) is a con man who has half a million dollars in bonds hidden in a cookbook. When he tries to sell a bogus oil investment to Dwight Chadwick (Lloyd Corrigan) at a Beverly Hills hotel, Dwight's attractive friend, Ricki Woodner (Lucille Ball), intervenes with a scam of her own.

Ace is about to go to prison for his part in the theft of the bonds. He arranges a deal to reduce his sentence by testifying, angering his former partner in crime, Fly Feletti (Elisha Cook, Jr.).

A cop, Bob Simms (Lloyd Nolan), is assigned to accompany Ace on the train from Los Angeles to New York. The passengers include Ricki, who is falling for Ace and wants to help, and Fly, who wants to  keep Ace from making it to New York.

Along the way, Ace and Ricki manage to get off the train in New Orleans to enjoy Mardi Gras together. When they do, Ace leaves the book at a costume shop, confident no one will notice it until he returns for it. During a romantic moment around midnight, Ace reveals to Ricki where he's hidden the bonds. Fly makes his move, but Simms is able to beat him to the draw. Ace fears that con artist Ricki has taken it on the lam with his dough, but she turns up, ready to wait for Ace till he's out of Sing Sing.

Cast
 Lucille Ball as Ricki Woodner
 John Hodiak as Ace Connors
 Lloyd Nolan as Bob Simms
 Hugo Haas as Seïnor Rodriquez, Dept. of Agriculture
 Lenore Ulric as Maria Ynez, Inn of the 4 Winds
 Elisha Cook, Jr. as Fly Feletti
 Lloyd Corrigan as Dwight Chadwick
 Vladimir Sokoloff as Monsieur Jacques Dufour
 David Cota as Jose
 Clarence Muse as Porter

Box office
The film earned $871,000 in the US and Canada and $328,000 elsewhere causing MGM a loss of $252,000.

Reception
When the film was released the film critic for The New York Times panned it, writing, "Except for a lively and colorful series of Mardi Gras sequences in New Orleans, which are introduced quite late in the picture, Two Smart People is an otherwise dreadfully boring hodgepodge about love and the confidence racket ... John Hodiak and Lucille Ball are the principals and they are painfully defeated by the script at almost every turn. Lloyd Nolan as the patient sleuth fares a little better, however. But in addition to its pedestrian plot, Two Smart People also suffers from lack of competent direction."

References

External links
 
 
 
 

1946 films
1946 crime drama films
American crime drama films
American black-and-white films
Film noir
Films about con artists
Films directed by Jules Dassin
Metro-Goldwyn-Mayer films
1940s English-language films
1940s American films